The Eastern Zone was one of the three regional zones of the 1962 Davis Cup.

8 teams entered the Eastern Zone, with the winner going on to compete in the Inter-Zonal Zone against the winners of the America Zone and Europe Zone. India defeated the Philippines in the final and progressed to the Inter-Zonal Zone.

Draw

Quarterfinals

Pakistan vs. India

Iran vs. Malaya

South Korea vs. Japan

Ceylon vs. Philippines

Semifinals

India vs. Iran

Philippines vs. Japan

Final

India vs. Philippines

References

External links
Davis Cup official website

Davis Cup Asia/Oceania Zone
Eastern Zone
Davis Cup